Helen Goss (15 October 19031985) was a British stage, television and film actress. She was also a drama teacher and for a period was responsible for admissions to the Rank Charm School.

Filmography

References

External links
 

1903 births
1985 deaths
British stage actresses
British film actresses
British television actresses
Actresses from London
20th-century British actresses
20th-century English women
20th-century English people